Marion Long  (1882 – 1970) was an artist, elected to the Royal Canadian Academy in 1922.  She was a highly commissioned artist and often painted military portraits.

Biography
Long studied at OCAD University (then known as Ontario College of Art and Design), privately with Laura Muntz Lyall and Charles Hawthorne. In New York she studied at the Art Students League from 1907-1908 with Robert Henri, William Merritt Chase, and Kenneth Hayes Miller. Long opened her own studio in Toronto in 1913. She eventually occupied Studio One in the Studio Building when A. Y. Jackson went on active military service and Tom Thomson moved to the shack near the building. In 1915, Long contributed three drawings to The Canadian Magazine that provide a fresh interpretation of the First World War from a woman’s point of view, including Home on Furlough (1915), Looking at the War Pictures (1915), and Killed in Action (1915). In 1933 she was elected as a full member of the Royal Canadian Academy of Arts.

Memberships
Royal Canadian Academy of Arts, Associate, 1922; Academician, 1933
Ontario Society of Artists, 1916
Ontario Institute of Painters
Heliconian Club, President, 1919

Awards 
received the King Haakon VII medal of liberation for services to Norway during World War II.

Record sale price 
At the Heffel Auction, April 2021, Marion Long`s Little Fruit Store, an 8 1/2 x 10 1/2 in. sketch, sold for $40,250.00 CAD.

References

Bibliography

External links
National Gallery of Canada
Images by Marion Long
Brandon, Laura. War Art in Canada: A Critical History. Toronto: Art Canada Institute, 2021.

1882 births
1970 deaths
20th-century Canadian painters
20th-century Canadian women artists
Artists from Toronto
OCAD University alumni
Art Students League of New York alumni